Rhamnocercoides is a genus of monopisthocotylean monogeneans, belonging to the family Diplectanidae. All species of Rhamnocercoides are parasites of marine perciform fishes of the family Sciaenidae.

Etymology
The generic name is based "in the morphological similarity with the genus Rhamnocercus".

Species
According to the World Register of Marine Species, two species are included in the genus:

 Rhamnocercoides dominguesi Chero, Cruces, Sáez, Iannacone & Luque, 2017 
 Rhamnocercoides menticirrhi Luque & Iannacone, 1991

References

Diplectanidae
Monogenea genera
Parasites of fish